The Australasian Anti-Transportation League was a body established to oppose penal transportation to Australia. Beginning in Van Diemen's Land (Tasmania) in the late 1840s, it had branches in Adelaide, Melbourne, Sydney, and Canterbury (New Zealand). The Colonial Office abandoned transportation to eastern Australia in 1852.

Development
Transportation to New South Wales (then, the colony covering the eastern Australian mainland, modern New South Wales, Victoria and Queensland) had ceased in 1840 and the number transported to Van Diemen's Land increased sharply. A two-year suspension of the transportation of male convicts to Van Diemen's Land was implemented in May 1846. It was the intention to resume transportation under new arrangements but that decision was conveyed to the local colonial administrator, William Denison in the following terms: "it is not the intention that transportation should be resumed at the expiration of the two years"; the words "under the present system" were omitted. The dispatch, taken to mean what it said on its face, was made public before the imperial authorities corrected their error.

By 1851, it had developed into the Australasian League for the Abolition of Transportation with branches on the mainland.  In Tasmania's first partially elective Legislative Council, its supporters won all 16 seats up for election. The Legislative Council subsequently voted 16 to 4 to request Queen Victoria to revoke the Order in Council, permitting transportation to Tasmania and Norfolk Island in spite of the strong opposition of Lieutenant Governor William Denison.  The Victorian gold rush, commencing in the same year, led the British Government to discontinue transportation, because it was seen as an incentive for criminals to be transported to eastern Australia, and the last convict ship to be sent from England, the St. Vincent, arrived in Tasmania in 1853.

Flag 
The League had its own flag, the Union Jack with the Southern Cross which was created before 1851 by John West, a Launceston congregational minister, author and newspaper editor.

2010 – 12 research project
The Australian Research Council has funded a research project, Liberty, Anti-transportation and the Empire of Morality by Professor Hilary Carey, The University of Newcastle with Professor David Roberts, The University of New England. Outputs include Carey's Empire of Hell, published by Cambridge University Press in 2019.

References

Further reading 
 A. G. L. Shaw, Convicts and the Colonies (1966, London)

Convictism in Australia
History of Australia (1851–1900)
History of immigration to Australia
Social history of Australia
Economic history of Australia
Protests in Australia